Patinoire de Boulogne-Billancourt is an indoor arena located in Boulogne-Billancourt, France. It is the home arena of the AC Boulogne-Billancourt ice hockey team. The arena opened in 1955.

References

Indoor ice hockey venues in France
Sports venues in Hauts-de-Seine